Christopher Edward "Chris" Kromer (born August 1, 1973) is an American actor and television host. He is co-host of the reality series Beat the House on HGTV.

Early life
Kromer was born in Queens, New York and was raised in New Jersey. Kromer's mother was a successful real estate agent, and he grew up in the real estate business.

Career
As an actor, Kromer has starred in short films and played roles in national commercials for Sprint, Chrysler, and Clearisil as well as guest roles in the television series Thumb Wrestling Federation (TWF), Law & Order, Guiding Light, Gossip Girl, and Royal Pains. He has been a host of the television show Cool In Your Code. In 2014, he became co-host of the new HGTV series Beat the House. As a voice actor he has done English anime voiceovers for Yûsha ô Gaogaigar, Berserk, Samurai Deeper Kyo, Hi no tori, Kurokami: The Animation, Queen's Blade Rebellion, and Yu-Gi-Oh! Zexal along with the anime film series Berserk: The Golden Age Arc and the animated film The Painting. He also provided the voice for Kirby Olsen one of the jocks in the 2006 video game Bully, From Rockstar Games. As a business man Kromer worked as a financial consultant at Ernst & Young LLP for three years. Now he works as a real estate agent at Halstead Property. He has brokered the 4th most expensive sale of 2013 in New York City, he is in the top 5% of the company in the producers council, he was voted broker of the year in the village office, and he won the 2013 top diamond award company wide. He also was voted by Trulia and real trends the top real estate agent in New York, and he is a board certified New York residential specialist and a certified negotiation expert. Kromer is also a former pianist and he has played at Carnegie Hall, in his spare time he still devotes himself in the arts of piano.

Filmography

Film

Television

Video games

Personal life
Kromer is a graduate of Rutgers University. Since then, he has lived mostly in the Upper East and Upper West Side of New York with his wife and children.

References

External links
 

1973 births
Living people
American real estate brokers
American financial businesspeople
Businesspeople from Queens, New York
Businesspeople from New Jersey
Musicians from Queens, New York
Musicians from New Jersey
People from New Jersey
20th-century American male actors
21st-century American male actors
American male television actors
Male actors from New York City
Male actors from New Jersey
American television hosts
Rutgers University alumni
American male pianists
21st-century American pianists
21st-century American male musicians